Buildings and Grounds is the third studio album by Papas Fritas, released on Minty Fresh in 2000. In Australia it was distributed by local label Half a Cow, their first release of a non-Aussie album since Bettie Serveert's Palomine five years earlier. It was the band's final studio album.

Critical reception
The Austin Chronicle wrote that "the arrangements are particularly grin-inducing, with their headphone-ready little tweaks and snippets of synthesized smarts and fleshy string flourishes." The Washington Post wrote that the band "doesn't overstate or over-embellish its material, relying on direct arrangements, bright tunes and the boy-girl vocal contrast between the band's two singers."

Track listing
"Girl" (Tony Goddess) – 3:18
"People Say" (Goddess, Shivika Asthana) – 4:26
"Way You Walk" (Goddess) – 3:48
"Vertical Lives" (Keith Gendel) – 3:39
"What Am I Supposed to Do?" (Goddess) – 2:58
"Far From an Answer" (Asthana, Goddess) – 4:56
"I Believe in Fate" (Goddess) – 3:58
"It's Over Now" (Asthana, Goddess) – 4:15
"Questions" (Goddess) – 3:18
"Beside You" (Asthana, Goddess) – 3:23
"Another Day" (Goddess) – 3:03
"I'll Be Gone" (Asthana, Ed Buck) – 3:30
"Lost in a Dream" (Goddess) – 3:48

Personnel
 Shivika Asthana: drums, vocals
 Keith Gendel: bass, vocals
 Tony Goddess: guitar, piano, vocals

Production notes
Recorded at the Columnated Ruins (Gloucester, Mass.) and the Backporch and the Krackhaus (Somerville, Massachusetts). Engineered and mixed by Paul Sanni. Analog consultation by Paul Q. Kolderie. Mastered by Roger Siebel at SAE (Phoenix, Arizona).

References

Papas Fritas albums
2000 albums